Canthigaster bennetti is a pufferfish from the Indo-Pacific. It occasionally makes its way into the aquarium trade. It grows to a size of 10 cm in length.

References

External links
 

bennetti
Taxa named by Pieter Bleeker
Fish described in 1854